William Birch Haldeman (July 27, 1846 - October 27, 1924) was the state adjutant general for the Kentucky Army National Guard from 1912 to 1914. He was part owner of The Courier-Journal and The Louisville Times.

Biography
He was born on July 27, 1846 in Louisville, Kentucky to Walter N. Haldeman. November 29, 1876 he married Lizzie Robards Offutt (1857-1930)in Shelbyville, Shelby County, Kentucky. 

He was the state adjutant general for the Kentucky Army National Guard from 1912 to 1914.

He died on October 27, 1924 in Louisville while attending a horse race at Churchill Downs.

References

External links

1846 births
1924 deaths
Military personnel from Louisville, Kentucky
Courier Journal people